Carl Barus (February 19, 1856 – September 20, 1935) was an American physicist and the maternal great-uncle of the American novelist Kurt Vonnegut. 

Barus was born in Cincinnati, United States. The son of German immigrants (the musician Carl Barus, Sr. and Sophia, nee Möllmann) graduated from Woodward High School, together with William Howard Taft, in 1874.

After studying mining engineering for two years, he moved to Würzburg, Germany, where he studied physics under Friedrich Kohlrausch, and graduated summa cum laude in 1879.

Barus married Annie Gertrude Howes on January 20, 1887. They had two children, Maxwell and Deborah. In the United States in 1892, he was a member of the American Philosophical Society, and the youngest of all members to National Academy of Sciences.

In 1903 he was appointed as a dean of the Brown University Graduate Department, which he was controlling from his office in Wilson Hall. He remained the dean of the graduate school until his retirement in 1926. By that time, the department had grown large enough to become a school within the university which has been attributed to his many contributions. In 1905 he was a corresponding member of Britain and the same year became a member of the First International Congress of Radiology and Electricity at Brussels. The same year, he became a member of the Physikalisch-Medizinische Sozietät at Erlangen. Also, the same year he became the fourth president of American Physical Society, and in 1906, became a member on the advisory board of physics, at the Carnegie Institution of Washington state.

Barus died in Providence, Rhode Island, United States.

References

External links

 Biographical Memoir of Carl Barus 1856-1935 (1941) by Robert Bruce Lindsay, presented to the National Academy of Sciences at the Autumn meeting.
 Biography from Brown University
 
 Moellmann family papers, Rare Books and Manuscripts, Indiana State Library
 Carl Barus Papers from Friends Historical Library of Swarthmore College 

Smithsonian Institution Archives
 Carl Barus (1856-1935)
 Carl Barus Papers, 1891, 1893

1856 births
1935 deaths
American people of German descent
American physicists
Members of the American Philosophical Society
Members of the United States National Academy of Sciences
Scientists from Cincinnati
Woodward High School (Cincinnati, Ohio) alumni

Brown University faculty
Presidents of the American Physical Society